The 1909 IAAUS baseball season, play of college baseball in the United States organized by the Intercollegiate Athletic Association of the United States (IAAUS), a forerunner of the National Collegiate Athletic Association (NCAA), began in the spring of 1909.  Play largely consisted of regional matchups, some organized by conferences, and ended in June.  No national championship event was held until 1947.

New programs
Oklahoma State (then Oklahoma A&M) played their first varsity season.

Conference winners
This is a partial list of conference champions from the 1909 season.

Award winners

All-Southern team

References